Chunk of Change is the debut extended play (EP) by American electropop band Passion Pit, released on September 16, 2008, by Frenchkiss Records and Columbia Records. A video for the single "Sleepyhead" was released in October 2008, directed by The Wilderness. The track was featured in the debut trailer for the 2011 video game LittleBigPlanet 2. "Better Things" was sampled by the alternative hip hop duo Chiddy Bang for their 2009 song "Truth".

Background
The tracks "Better Things" and "Sleepyhead" were added for the commercial release of the EP. "Sleepyhead" was eventually included on Passion Pit's debut studio album, Manners (2009).

Track listing

Sample credits
 "Sleepyhead" contains elements from "Óró Mo Bháidín" by Mary O'Hara.

Personnel
Credits adapted from the liner notes of Chunk of Change.

 Michael Angelakos – recording
 Ian Hultquist – vocal engineering 
 Frank Napolski – artwork, layout

Charts

Release history

References

2008 debut EPs
Columbia Records EPs
Passion Pit albums